Off-track betting (or OTB; in British English, off-course betting) is sanctioned gambling on greyhound racing or horse racing outside a race track.

U.S. history
Before the 1970s, only the state of Nevada allowed off-track betting. Off-track betting in New York was legalized in 1970, after years of unsuccessful attempts. By the 1970s there were 100 betting parlors in New York City, and twice that number by the late 1980s. In New York City, the thought was that legal off-track betting would increase revenue while at the same time decrease illegal gambling activity, but one effect of the legalization was a decrease of revenue at racetracks. The 1978 Interstate Horseracing Act struck a compromise between the interests of horse tracks and owners, the state, and OTB parlors, and stipulated that OTB revenues were to be distributed among the tracks, the horse owners, and the state. Another stipulation was that no OTB parlor was allowed to operate within  of a track.

Revenues at the track indeed lessened, but rather than fight off-track betting, the industry sought to increase its income via new ways of gambling, betting on the OTB potential, and came up with "exotic wagers" such as exacta and trifecta. Thus the industry's revenue increased even as the number of spectators at the track went down.

At legal off-track betting parlors, if bettors win, they have to pay the parlor a surcharge taken directly from the winnings. Bettors in New York can avoid paying the surcharges by placing their bets via an off-track betting corporation's account wagering service or at so-called super branches or teletheatres that charge a daily admission fee. Other jurisdictions such as Pennsylvania do not levy a surcharge on winnings. Most booked bets are now placed with licensed services in the Caribbean and Central America who entice bettors by offering them rebates on their bets.

In December 2010, the New York City OTB closed due to lack of profitability.

Canada 
After years of unsuccessful attempts and public anticipation in Canada, off-track betting (OTB) establishments (also known as 'Teletheatres') were finally legalized on the federal level, in Ottawa on June 29, 1989. Since then, the industry has flourished nationwide with hundreds of off-track betting facilities across the country.

This industry is federally regulated by the Canadian Pari-Mutuel Agency (CPMA). The CPMA makes regulations in respect to pari-mutuel betting, and is responsible for ensuring the integrity and fairness of betting systems in Canada. Among the responsibilities of the CPMA include administering drug tests to horses to enforce the anti-drug policies.

Ontario 

All off-track betting in Ontario is licensed by the Ontario Racing Commission (ORC) and is responsible for the integrity of the industry in the province. They are also responsible for distributing racing licenses, keeping a horse registry and running a problem gambling group.

To apply for a license the operator would need to purchase a permit from the ORC. If accepted, the site operator receives no profit from the betting exchanges—they make money from the increased traffic of customers and other creative methods. (i.e. cover charge, selling racing programs)

There are approximately 70 off-track betting facilities that have been licensed in Ontario. There are also a number of racetracks located in Ontario.

The Woodbine Entertainment Group is the most prominent organization, that owns a number of racetracks but also owns a number of off-track betting facilities across Canada.

See also
 Totalisator

References

External links

Sports betting